Prusinowice  is a village in the administrative district of Gmina Świercze, within Pułtusk County, Masovian Voivodeship, in east-central Poland.

The village has a population of 150.

References

Prusinowice